The following ships of the Indian Navy have been named INS Tillanchang:

  was a  commissioned in 2001 and transferred to the Maldivian coastguard as MCGS Huravee in 2006
  is a  launched in 2015

Indian Navy ship names